The 2007–08 season of the Belize Premier Football League, otherwise known as the RFG Insurance Cup, began on September 30, 2007 and concluded in April 2008. FC Belize of Belize City entered as defending champions.

Hankook Verdes won the title and qualified for the 2008–09 CONCACAF Champions League.

League tables

Regular season

Semifinal round

Results/fixtures

Week 1 

September 30: 
 MCC Grounds: FC Belize 1-2 Santel's SC
 Carl Ramos Stadium: Revolutionary Conquerors 1-1 San Pedro Dolphins
 Norman Broaster Stadium: Hankook Verdes United 1-2 Wagiya
October 4:
 Orange Walk People's Stadium: Juventus 0-1 Defence Force (rescheduled from September 30 after call-off due to rain)
Georgetown Ibayani: bye

Week 2 
October 6:
 MCC: Defence Force 0-2 FC Belize
October 7:
 Norman Broaster: Santel's 1-2 Juventus
 Ambergris: San Pedro 0-1 Verdes
 Carl Ramos: Wagiya 3-1 Georgetown
Revolutionary Conquerors: bye

Week 3 
October 13:
 Georgetown 1-1 San Pedro
 FC Belize 1-1 Wagiya
October 14:
 Verdes 0-0 Defence Force
 Conquerors 1-2 Santel's
Juventus: bye

Week 4 
 Defence Force 1-1 Conquerors
 Santels 2-1 Ibayani
 San Pedro 1-1 FC Belize
 Juventus 5-1 Wagiya
Verdes: bye

Week 5 
October 27: 
 Michael Ashcroft: Ibayani 2-1 Verdes
 People's Stadium: Juventus 0-1 San Pedro
October 28:
 Carl Ramos: Conquerors 4-1 FC Belize
 MCC: Defence Force 1-0 Santels
Wagiya: bye

Week 6 

November 3:
 Michael Ashcroft: Georgetown 0-2 Conquerors
November 4:
 Norman Broaster: Santel's 0-2 Verdes
 Carl Ramos: Wagiya 0-0 Defence Force
 MCC: FC Belize 2-0 Juventus

San Pedro: bye

Week 7 

 Norman Broaster, November 10: Santel's 1-4 Wagiya. Frazier 71'-Tasher 31', 63'; Castillo 65', Archer 89'.
 People's Stadium, November 11: Juventus 2-2 Georgetown. O. Hendricks 31', F. Tun 57'-I. Castillo 51', B. Burgess 89'.
 Carl Ramos, November 11: Conquerors 2-3 Verdes. E. Kuylen 18', K. Haylock 43'-D. Jimenez 3', 24', 75'.
 MCC, November 11: Defence Force 1-1 San Pedro. D. McCaulay 41'-R.G. Hicks 62'.
 FC Belize: bye

Week 8 
November 17:
 Michael Ashcroft: Ibayani 0-1 FC Belize
November 18:
 Ambergris Stadium: Dolphins 2-0 Santels'
 Norman Broaster: Verdes 2-1 Juventus
 Carl Ramos: Conquerors 2-2 Wagiya
 Defence Force: bye

Week 9 

November 24:
 Michael Ashcroft: Ibayani 2-3 Defence Force
November 25:
 Ambergris Stadium: Dolphins 0-0 Wagiya
 Carl Ramos: Conquerors 2-3 Juventus
 MCC: FC Belize 2-2 Verdes
 Santel's: bye

Week 10 
December 1:
 Norman Broaster: Santel's 5-1 Conquerors
December 2:
 People's Stadium: Juventus 1-0 FC Belize
 Carl Ramos: Wagiya 2-4 Verdes
 MCC: BDF 1-1 Georgetown
Bye: San Pedro Dolphins

Week 11 
December 9:
 Ambergris Stadium: San Pedro 4-2 Juventus
 Norman Broaster: Verdes 2-2 Georgetown
 Carl Ramos: Wagiya 0-0 Santel's
 MCC: FC Belize 2-1 Defence Force
 Bye: Revolutionary Conquerors

Week 12 
December 15:		
 Santel's vs F.C. Belize, Norman Broaster, 7:30 pm
 George Town Ibayani vs Wagiya, Michael Ashcroft, 7:30 pm
December 16:	          	
 San Pedro Dolphins vs Revolutionary Conquerors, Ambergris Stad., 2:30 pm
 Belize Defense Force vs Hankook Verdes, MCC Grounds, 4:00 pm
Resting:  Suga Boys Juventus
Note: These games were postponed. Updated results will be posted.

Week 13 
December 22:
 George Town Ibayani 3-2 Santel's
December 23:
 Suga Boys Juventus 2-5 Wagiya
 Revolutionary Conquerors 2-2 Belize Defence Force
 F.C. Belize 5-1 San Pedro Dolphins
Resting:  Hankook Verdes

Week 14 
December 30: 
 San Pedro Dolphins 1-2 George Town Ibayani
 Hankook Verdes 1-1 Revolutionary Conquerors
 Wagiya 3-2 F.C. Belize
 Belize Defence Force 3-2 Suga Boys Juventus
Resting:  Santel's

Week 15 
January 5, 2008:
 Santel's vs San Pedro Dolphins, Norman Broaster, 7:30 pm 
(RAINED OUT; postponed to Jan. 10, 2008)
January 6, 2008:
 Suga Boys Juventus 0-3 Hankook Verdes
 Revolutionary Conquerors 0-2 Wagiya
 F.C. Belize 3-4 George Town Ibayani

Upcoming Fixtures

Week 16 
January 12, 2008:
 Santel's vs Hankook Verdes, Norman Broaster, 7:30 pm'THE WESTERN DERBY'
 Georgetown Ibayani vs Suga Boys Juventus, Michael Ashcroft, 7:30 pm
January 13, 2008:
 San Pedro Dolphins vs Belize Defence Force, Ambergris, 2:30 pm
 FC Belize vs. Revolutionary Conquerors, MCC, 4:00 pm

Goals 
Through Week 10:
 11: Jerome James, FC Belize
 10: Daniel Jimenez, Verdes
 8: Aaron McLaughlin, Wagiya; Oliver Hendricks, Juventus.
 5: Bent Burgess, Georgetown; Lennox Mejia, Conquerors; Anthony Gonzalez, Santel's; Erwin Flores, BDF; Ricardo Jimenez, Verdes; Germaine Zuniga, F.C.; Harrison Tasher, Wagiya.
 4: David Trapp, Conquerors; Deon McCaulay, BDF; Ramon Hicks, San Pedro.
 10 players have three goals apiece.
 11 players have two goals apiece.
 33 players with one goal each.

Teams

References 

Top level Belizean football league seasons
1
Bel